Weißenthurm is a town in the district of Mayen-Koblenz, in Rhineland-Palatinate, Germany. It is situated on the left bank of the Rhine, opposite Neuwied, approximately 12 km northwest of Koblenz.

The town is spelled with an ß which may be replaced by ss if not available (Weissenthurm).

Weißenthurm is the seat of the Verbandsgemeinde ("collective municipality") Weißenthurm.

References

Towns in Rhineland-Palatinate
Mayen-Koblenz